The County of Follett is one of the 37 counties of Victoria which are part of the cadastral divisions of Australia, used for land titles. It comprises a strip in the far southwest of the state bounded by the Glenelg River to the east, South Australia to the west and Elderslie Creek to the north beyond Casterton. No larger towns are contained within its boundaries. The county was proclaimed in 1849.

Parishes 
Parishes within the county:
Ardno 
Bahgallah
Bogalara 
Byjuke
Dartmoor 
Drajurk  
Kaladbro
Kanawinka
Kinkella
Langkoop
Mageppa
Malanganee
Mumbannar
Nagwarry
Nangeela
Palpara
Roseneath
Tooloy
Tullich
Wanwin
Werrikoo
Wilkin

References

Vicnames, place name details
Research aids, Victoria 1910

Counties of Victoria (Australia)
Barwon South West (region)